Jabez Young Jackson (born 5 August 1790) was a U.S. representative from Georgia. He was also a slave owner.

Biography
Jackson was born in Savannah, Georgia, the son of James Jackson (1757–1806), and later uncle of James Jackson (1819–1887).   He was elected as a Jacksonian to the Twenty-fourth United States Congress to fill the vacancy caused by the resignation of James M. Wayne.  In 1836, he was reelected as a Democrat to the Twenty-fifth United States Congress, serving from October 5, 1835 – March 3, 1839.

References

External links 

1790 births
Year of death unknown
Jacksonian members of the United States House of Representatives from Georgia (U.S. state)
19th-century American politicians
Democratic Party members of the United States House of Representatives from Georgia (U.S. state)
People from Clarkesville, Georgia
Politicians from Savannah, Georgia
American slave owners